The Château de Siéyès is a château in Voreppe, Isère, France. It was built in the 17th century. It has been listed as an official historical monument since June 6, 1980.

References

Châteaux in Isère
Houses completed in the 17th century
Monuments historiques of Isère